The Tsubasa: Reservoir Chronicle manga by Clamp inspired two original video animation (OVA) series animated by Production I.G. They were directed by Shunsuke Tada and written by Nanase Ohkawa, with music provided by Yuki Kajiura. A three-episode OVA series titled  was released between November 16, 2007, and March 17, 2008, across three DVDs bundled with limited versions of volumes 21, 22, and 23 of the manga. Their plot is set after the anime's ending, and follows the arrival of Syaoran's group in a postapocalyptic Tokyo, where the connection between Syaoran and a teenager identical to him is revealed. 

A two-episode OVA series titled  was released across two DVDs. The first was packaged with volume 26 of the manga, which was released on March 17, 2009; and the second was packaged with volume 27, released on May 15, 2009. They are set after the characters' journey to Seresu as they search for a way to make Sakura's soul return to her body. In May 2010, Funimation announced they licensed both series of OVAs. They were released together under the title of "Tsubasa: RESERVoir CHRoNiCLE — OVA Collection" in both DVD and Blu-ray formats on January 4, 2011. In June 2011, Funimation started streaming the five episodes on their official website.

Critical response to the OVAs has been positive for the improvement of animation and the darker storyline involving the conflict between the two identical teenagers known as Syaoran. However, the lack of sequels to Spring Thunder Chonricles was a subject of criticism as the narrative's climax is foreshadowen but never reached.

Episode list

Tsubasa: Tokyo Revelations

Tsubasa: Spring Thunder Chronicles

Production 

In contrast to the Tsubasa: Reservoir Chronicle television series which was directed by Koichi Mashimo from Bee Train, the OVAs were directed by Shunsuke Tada from Production I.G. He was assisted by Clamp writer Nanase Ohkawa. Tada felt nervous when working in the two OVAs due to how challenging was the production, especially because of how popular was the original series. He did not find this production of Tsubasa different from the television series with the exception of the fact that most viewers bought special versions of the manga to watch them.

In regards to Tokyo Revelations, Tada faced the idea of the scenarios challenging to the setting being based on the city of Tokyo which led the team to make research in order to produce a visually appealing area. However, it does not mean that it would beautiful if it is made into a video as it is, so he might talk about that part in the form of following up in the actual work. In contrast to the realism of Tokyo Revelations, Spring Thunder Chronicles took a more fantasy style due to its different worlds explored. A common element in regards to the fantasy style of Spring Thunder Chronicles is how the ancient Japan world tends to heavily focus on cherry blossom flowers.

The main cast from the television series returned with Miyu Irino now playing the two identical characters who serve as protagonist: the returning Syaoran and the new Syaoran who briefly appeared in the series. Since he has to voice the two characters, Irino found this work challenging as he need to give both Syaoran distinct personalities but was still looking forward to their fight scenes. Yui Makino plays the role of Sakura who reflected on how Sakura changed across the narrative as, in the first episode of the television series she acted cheerful and high spirited. However, after losing her soul, Sakura was calmer and gradually returned to her previous self based on the how Syaoran recovered its parts, the Feathers. Daisuke Namikawa plays Fai D. Flowright and lamented that his darker personality was not fully explored as the OVAs skipped his backstory.

Tsubasa Tokyo Revelations features two pieces of theme music. "Synchronicity" performed by Yui Makino is the opening theme.  performed by Maaya Sakamoto is the ending theme. When writing "Saigo no Kajitsu", Sakamoto described Syaoran's fate as sad because he becomes the antagonist of his friends and is a clone. It was translated into English by FUNimation Entertainment. For the second series, "Sonic Boom" performed by Maaya Sakamoto is the opening theme.  performed by FictionJunction Yuuka is the ending theme.

Reception 
Although the Tsubasa OVAs were not the first original animation DVDs (OADs), OVAs published with manga volumes, its release helped to popularize the term. Chris Beveridge from Mania Entertainment considered the OVAs to have better quality than the TV series, mainly because they were developed by Production I.G instead of Bee Train and because they have a darker storyline. While DVDTalk found Syaoran's story similar to that of Sora from the Kingdom Hearts video games developed by the Square Enix, he felt that the narrative provided in both OVAs provided a darker tone as well as multiple plot twists that might heavily surprise the audience through the subject of cloning. Blu-ray agreed with the darker tones and twists which marked a different tone from the television series. Similarly, Anime News Network enjoyed how the narrative relied on the Syaoran clone as antagonist rather than Fei-Wang Reed but still felt the plot confusing.

In a further review, Beveridge found fascinating the events occurring in the OVAs due to the number of revelations changed the way people viewed the series. The character designs were felt to be more similar to the manga's ones than the TV series, while the animation has been considered "a notch above that of standard Television". The themes were noted to be more mature both brutally and mentally; although the number of changes presented throughout them has been praised, another series of OVAs that would conclude the storyline built in the last episode from Spring Thunder Chronicles has been requested by reviewers. DVD Talk also praised the highly-detailed animation. Blu-ray in particular found the animated fight sequences appealing based on the fluid moves and the pacing executed when characters talk. Anime News Network also enjoyed the music as it reminded him of the soundtrack from Ghost in the Shell which he enjoyed as well as the serious voice acting performed through the characters of Kurogane and Mokona.

Notes

References 

 
2007 anime OVAs
2009 anime OVAs
Anime OVAs composed by Yuki Kajiura
Funimation